The New Zealand national football team has competed in all ten editions of the OFC Nations Cup, and have won five times, the most recent coming in the 2016 tournament.

On 1 January 2006, Australia ceased to be a member of the Oceania Football Confederation, having elected to join the Asian Football Confederation (AFC), and have not taken part in the OFC Nations Cup since.

OFC Nations Cup record

Record by opponent

1973 Oceania Cup

The first edition of the Oceania Nations Cup (known as the "Oceania Cup") took place in Newmarket Park in Auckland, New Zealand. Five countries participated in one group where each team played each other once. The top two teams progressed to the final where New Zealand defeated Tahiti 2-0 to be crowned champions.

Group matches

Knockout stage

1980 Oceania Cup

The second edition of the OFC Nations Cup, held in New Caledonia, consisted of eight teams divided into two groups of four, with the group winners progressing to the final and the runners-up contesting the third place play-off match. After three group matches, New Zealand failed to progress to the knockout stages of the tournament.

Group matches

1996 OFC Nations Cup

The third edition of the OFC Nations cup was not held as a cohesive tournament but consisted of four teams and two home-and-away rounds spanning two years. New Zealand played Australia, and Tahiti played the Solomon Islands, with Australia and Tahiti progressing to the final. The two matches between New Zealand and Australia also doubled as the 1995 edition of the Trans-Tasman Cup.

1998 OFC Nations Cup

Six teams competed in the 1998 OFC Nations Cup which was held at Suncorp Stadium in Brisbane, Australia. The six teams were divided into two groups of three, with the top two teams from each group progressing to the semi-finals. New Zealand defeated Australia in the final to earn a spot at the 1999 FIFA Confederations Cup.

Group A

Group stage

Knockout stage

2000 OFC Nations Cup

As in the previous edition of the Nations Cup, the 2000 tournament included six teams divided into two groups of three. The top two teams from each group progressed to the knockout stages with Australia defeating New Zealand in the final to claim the title of Oceania champion, and secure a place at the 2001 FIFA Confederations Cup.

Group 2

Group stage

Knockout stage

2002 OFC Nations Cup

The sixth edition of the OFC Nations Cup saw eight teams participate in two groups of four teams each. Each team played the other once, and the top two teams progressed to the knockout stages. After defeating Vanuatu in the semi-final, New Zealand went on to defeat long-time rivals Australia to be crowned OFC Champions and qualify for the 2003 FIFA Confederations Cup.

Group B

Group stage

Knockout Stage

2004 OFC Nations Cup

The 2004 OFC Nations Cup - which doubled as FIFA World Cup qualifying for the Oceania region - consisted of two rounds. The first round saw six nations compete in a single group where each team played the other once. The top two teams progressed to a home-and-away finals series to determine the winner of the Nations Cup.

Due to a shock 4–2 loss to Vanuatu, New Zealand failed to place in the top two, resulting in Australia taking on the Solomon Islands in the two-legged final, eventually winning 5–1 away and 6–0 at home to claim the title of OFC Champions for a fourth time.

Group matches

2008 OFC Nations Cup

The 2008 tournament doubled as FIFA World Cup qualification matches for the Oceania region and consisted of just four teams in one group with matches spread out over two years. Each team played the other twice with New Zealand - the top team of the group - being crowned the OFC Nations Cup champions as well as earning a spot in the play-off match against the 5th best Asian team for a spot at the 2010 FIFA World Cup in South Africa.

Group matches

2012 OFC Nations Cup

The ninth edition of the OFC Nations Cup was held in Honiara, Solomon Islands with eight teams in the competition. The teams were divided into two groups of four, each playing the other teams once. The top two teams of each group progressed to the knockout stages which consisted of semi-finals a final round to determine the winner of the OFC Nations Cup.

Tahiti won the competition for the first time in its history after tournament favourites New Zealand lost to New Caledonia in the semi-final. Tahiti's triumph was also the first time a nation other than Australia or New Zealand has won the OFC Nations Cup.

The group stage of the 2012 Nations Cup also doubled as World Cup qualifying matches, with the top two teams from each group progressing to stage 3 of qualifying. The winner of the 2012 Nations Cup would also represent Oceania at the 2013 FIFA Confederations Cup.

Group B

Group stage

Knockout stage

2016 OFC Nations Cup

Group B

Group stage

Knock-out stage

Statistics

Goalscorers

See also
New Zealand national football team
New Zealand national football team results
New Zealand at the FIFA World Cup
New Zealand at the FIFA Confederations Cup

References

 
Countries at the OFC Nations Cup
OFC Nations Cup